James J. Spratt (July 15, 1877 – 1960) was a building contractor and politician in Newfoundland. He represented St. John's West in the Newfoundland House of Assembly from 1949 to 1951.

The son of Thomas Spratt and Mary Kavanagh, he was born in St. John's and was educated at St. Patrick's Hall. He first was employed as a bookkeeper  and later worked in construction, first in roofing and masonry and later as a builder and contractor. He served as secretary of the Bricklayers and Masons Union for 35 years. In 1904, Spratt married Annie Trelagan; the couple had seven children. He was a member of the Total Abstinence and Benefit Society.

Spartt served sixteen years on St. John's municipal council, including four years  as deputy mayor. He was elected to the Newfoundland assembly in 1949 and served in the provincial cabinet as Minister of Provincial Affairs. Spratt retired from politics in 1951.

His son Herbert was convicted of murdering his fiancée in 1942 and became the last person executed in Newfoundland.

References 

1877 births
1960 deaths
Members of the Executive Council of Newfoundland and Labrador
Liberal Party of Newfoundland and Labrador MHAs